Carol Diane Fuchs is an entertainment attorney, producer, and World Series of Poker bracelet winner.

Fuchs wrote the screenplay for the 2007 romantic comedy No Reservations.

Fuchs' sister is attorney Jacqueline Fuchs, who was known as Jackie Fox when a member of The Runaways rock and roll band in the 1970s. Carol Fuchs is married to Martin Shafer, Chairman/CEO of Castle Rock Entertainment. Fuchs and Shafer sometimes play in a home poker game featuring other Castle Rock executives.

At the 2015 World Series of Poker, Fuchs won the $1500 Dealer's Choice tournament and its $127,735 first prize, making her the first female winner at the 2015 WSOP in an open field event, and the 21st woman to win an open event bracelet.  Fuchs previously won titles at the L.A. Poker Open in 2005 and 2011. Fuchs started playing poker after reading Positively Fifth Street by James McManus.  As of 2018, Fuchs' total live poker tournament winnings exceed $700,000.

References

External links
 

American women screenwriters
American poker players
Female poker players
World Series of Poker bracelet winners
Living people
Year of birth missing (living people)
21st-century American women